Ekaterina Chernysheva (1715-1779) was a Russian courtier.

She was the daughter of Andrey Ushakov and married the diplomat count Peter Chernyshev, Russian ambassador to Denmark, Prussia, England and France, and was the mother of Darya Petrovna Saltykova and Natalya Golitsyna.

From 1730 until her marriage in 1738, she served as maid of honour to Anna of Russia. She was a favorite and confidante of Anna Leopoldovna, which resulted in a demand from the powerful favorite Ernst Johann von Biron that she persuade Anna to refuse a marriage to Duke Anthony Ulrich of Brunswick in favor of Peter von Biron, a task she unsuccessfully tried to achieve.

References 
 Русские портреты 18-19 столетий. Т.2. Вып. 4. № 155

1715 births
1779 deaths
18th-century people from the Russian Empire
Ladies-in-waiting from the Russian Empire
Russian royal favourites
Burials at Lazarevskoe Cemetery (Saint Petersburg)